"Fantasy" is the debut single by Canadian rock musician Aldo Nova and is his most popular work to date. Released on his eponymous debut album in 1982.  VH1 listed it at #78 on its countdown for the 100 Greatest One Hit Wonders of the 80s.

Music video
The video portrays Nova performing with his band for an audience. In its opening sequence, a man holding a Gibson Les Paul guitar and two bodyguards holding machine guns wait for someone. The men surround a landing helicopter, and the one with the guitar opens the door. Nova exits the helicopter, clad in a leopard-print jumpsuit and a pair of cowboy boots, and is escorted to the stage. When they encounter a locked door, Nova takes the guitar, holds it like a rifle, and fires a laser beam into the door, forcing it open. Once inside, Nova leaps on stage where he and his band perform the song.

Chart performance
"Fantasy" climbed to #3 on the Mainstream Rock chart, and #23 on the Billboard Hot 100 singles chart.

In popular culture
"Fantasy" was used in the THQ/Volition Saints Row: The Third video game and its soundtrack.
The version by the band Steel Panther was used as the theme music for the reality television series Rob Dyrdek's Fantasy Factory.
The song was featured in a flashback sequence in the final episode of the popular television series Rob & Big.

References

1982 debut singles
1982 songs
Aldo Nova songs
Electronic rock songs
Portrait Records singles
Songs written by Aldo Nova